Dilara Uralp (born 16 November 1995) is a Turkish windsurfer, who specialized in the RS:X class. She is a member of Çeşmealtı Windsurfing & Sailing Club in Izmir. She studies Physical Education and Sports at Dokuz Eylül University in İzmir.

Diara Uralp was born in Germany on 16 November 1995. In 2005, she began with windsurfing initiated by her father. She has been competing at domestic events since 2006, and internationally since 2010.

She earned a quota spot at the 2016 Summer Olympics. She became so the first ever Turkish participant to compete in the windsurfing at the Olympics.

References

External links
 
 
 

1995 births
Living people
Turkish windsurfers
Turkish sportswomen
Female windsurfers
Olympic sailors of Turkey
Sailors at the 2016 Summer Olympics – RS:X
Sailors at the 2020 Summer Olympics – RS:X
Mediterranean Games competitors for Turkey
Competitors at the 2018 Mediterranean Games
German people of Turkish descent